(Devanagari: परिशिष्ट, "supplement, appendix, remainder") are Sanskrit supplementary texts appended to another fixed, more ancient text – typically the Vedic literature – that aim to "tell what remains to be told". These have style of sutras, but less concise. According to Max Mueller, the parisista of the Vedas, "may be considered the very last outskirts of Vedic literature, but they are Vedic in character, and it would be difficult to account for their origin at any time except the expiring moments of the Vedic age."

Within the early Sanskrit texts, 18 parisishtas are mentioned, but numerous more have survived into the modern era, likely composed later. Parisista exists for each of the four Vedas.  However, only the literature associated with the Atharvaveda is extensive and 74 parisishtas are known, some in the form of dialogues. The Vedic parisistas generally present rituals, ceremonies, nature of hymns, and opinions of other scholars about certain aspects of the primary text. The Atharvaveda parisishtas include omens in addition, and sections of it have survived in very corrupted form that is difficult to elucidate or interpret.

Rigveda
The  is a very late text associated with the Rigveda canon.  It is a short text of three chapters expanding on domestic rites such as the daily sandhyopāsana and rites of passage such as marriage and śrāddha.

The Bahvricha parisishta and Sankayana parisishta are also attached to the Rigveda.

Samaveda
The ,  ascribed to Gobhilaputra, is a concise metrical text of two chapters, with 113 and 95 verses respectively.  Its subjects are covered in a manner clear to those who understand Vedic Sanskrit.  The first chapter deals with physical aspects of  sacred cosmic rituals e.g. names of the 37 types of sacred fires, the rules and measurements for the firewood, preparation of the holy site and the timings of each cosmic activity.  The second chapter deals mainly with major domestic rites such as matrimony or Shrāddha (communication with ancestral beings).  Noteworthy are injunctions such as that a girl should be given away in marriage before she attains puberty.

A second short text, the  has roughly similar coverage.

Yajurveda

(White)

(Black)
The  Yajurveda has 3 parisistas:  
 The .
 The .

Atharvaveda
For the Atharvaveda, there are 79 works, collected as 72 distinctly named parisistas.

Notes

References
 BR Modak, The Ancillary Literature of the Atharva-Veda, New Delhi, Rashtriya Veda Vidya Pratishthan, 1993, 
Series #38), 1994

Hindu texts
Vedas